Brian Vranesh (born October 26, 1977) is an American professional golfer who has played on the PGA Tour and Web.com.

Vranesh was born in Northridge, California. He attended the College of the Canyons. He turned professional in 1999 and has no professional wins. He did, however, come close, at the Chitimacha Louisiana Open (a Nationwide Tour event), when he lost in a one hole playoff to Bubba Dickerson. On the PGA Tour, his best finish is tied for 8th at the 2009 Buick Open.

After his playing days ended, Vranesh became a caddy. He was on the bag for Kevin Chappell in 2019 before working for Si Woo Kim in 2021.

Personal
Cousin of Jon Garland, pitcher for the Los Angeles Dodgers. 
He is friends with fellow PGA Tour professionals Charley Hoffman and Pat Perez.

Playoff record
Nationwide Tour playoff record (0–1)

See also
2008 PGA Tour Qualifying School graduates

External links

American male golfers
PGA Tour golfers
Golfers from Los Angeles
Golfers from Phoenix, Arizona
People from Northridge, Los Angeles
1977 births
Living people